The BOK-5 was a tail-less research aircraft designed and built in the USSR from 1937, by the Byuro Osobykh Konstrooktsiy (bureau of special design).

Development 
The dural and fabric BOK-5 was a single-engined tail-less monoplane used to develop trailing edge controls for tail-less aircraft. The aircraft had a low aspect ratio moderately tapered wing with the fixed tail-wheel undercarriage, single M-11 engine, pilots cockpit all accommodated by the central nacelle which faired into an integral fin, with rudder, at the rear. The trailing edges were each divided into three with elevators inboard, flaps in the middle and ailerons outboard, with all controls inter-connected as required for the test being carried out (sometimes termed 'Flailevators' although this is usually used for single surfaces performing all three control tasks, not separate surfaces with control mixing). Flight trials were carried out by Stefanovskii and Nyukhtikov from the summer of 1937.

Variants 
 BOK-6 - Projected tail-less heavy bomber (a.k.a. TB)

Specifications (BOK-5)

See also

References

 Gunston, Bill. “The Osprey Encyclopaedia of Russian Aircraft 1875–1995”. London, Osprey. 1995.

External links
 https://www.youtube.com/watch?v=5W1pmqLHYm4

1930s Soviet experimental aircraft
BOK aircraft
Low-wing aircraft
Single-engined tractor aircraft
Tailless aircraft
Aircraft first flown in 1937